Waldron High School may refer to:

 Waldron High School (Arkansas), located in Waldron, Arkansas.
 Waldron High School (Michigan), located in Waldron, Michigan.
 Waldron Junior-Senior High School (Indiana), located in Waldron, Indiana